The Sunshine Ladies Tour is a professional golf tour for women based in South Africa.

Schedule
Since the inaugural 2014 season, tournaments have averaged around ten per season and been concentrated in the January–March window. Sponsors have included Investec, Jabra, Dimension Data, Sun International, SuperSport, Canon, the municipalities of Joburg, Cape Town and Ray Nkonyeni and Serengeti Estates. In 2019, over 40 foreign players, mainly European, competed on the tour.

Cooperation
The Ladies European Tour co-sanctions the flagship Investec South African Women's Open, and the champion receives a tournament winner's category exemption on the Ladies European Tour, as well as exemption into the two of the five majors that are held in Europe, Women's British Open and the Evian Championship.

Also, the winner of the Jabra Ladies Classic earns exemption for the Jabra Ladies Open, the final qualifying event for the Evian Championship.

Flagship tournaments
South African Women's Open – founded in 1988 and co-sanctioned by the Ladies European Tour
South African Women's Masters – founded in 1996 and co-sanctioned by the Ladies European Tour in 2001

Order of Merit winners

Source:

See also
Sunshine Tour – corresponding men's tour

References

External links
 

Sunshine Ladies Tour
Professional golf tours
Women's golf
Golf in South Africa
2014 establishments in South Africa
Sports leagues established in 2014